Dušan "Dule" Savić (born 1 June 1955) is a Serbian former footballer.

Club career
Savić started playing football in the local side Jedinstvo Ub in his hometown. He arrived for a tryout at Red Star's Marakana Stadium on 21 March 1972, and was promptly included in the club's youth system. Two years later in 1974, he became a first team player. He quickly grew into a feared striker and a fan favourite. At still only 19, he made his national team debut for Yugoslavia. He ended up playing more than 400 official matches for Red Star Belgrade.

After leaving Red Star halfway through the 1982-83 season, Savić had a six-month stint in La Liga with Sporting de Gijón where he was brought by countryman Vujadin Boškov who was the head coach at the Asturian club. Savić then spent six seasons in French Ligue 1: two with Lille OSC, and four with AS Cannes.

Post-playing
Savić performed the role of Red Star's sporting director from 1998 until 2005 under club president Dragan Džajić.

Personal life
Savić is married to TV journalist Marina Rajević who hosted a popular one-on-one talk-show Dok anđeli spavaju on RTS' third channel and later on BKTV.

They have two sons: Uroš and Vujadin. Vujadin plays for APOEL FC and a daughter named Teodora.

In pop culture
In addition to being a Red Star former great, fondly remembered by football fans across Serbia, Savić unexpectedly grew into somewhat of a pop-culture hero during the late 1990s. Several things contributed to this.

The 1997 movie The Wounds directed by Srđan Dragojević, features a scene with two main characters chanting "Duuuule Savić" during sexual intercourse with a prostitute. The chant is delivered in fashion similar to the way neighbourhood kids exclaim their favourite player's name after scoring a goal on the playground. Also, name Dule Savić is yelled out by disabled soldier in Dragojević's 1996 movie Pretty Village, Pretty Flame when he tries to kick papaya thrown to him by couple of junkies.

Then in 1996, rock band Prljavi Inspektor Blaža i Kljunovi released a track titled "Dule Savić" that is playing on the new meaning of "Dule Savić" with sexual connotations introduced by The Wounds movie.

Finally, in the 2000 comedy Munje! by Radivoj Andrić, 'Lepa sela lepo gore' Savić plays himself as deus ex machina of sorts in a scene featuring the main characters being stranded with a broken down vehicle in the middle of the night. Just as they are discussing Savić's famous 1979 UEFA Cup 3rd round goal vs. Arsenal F.C. at Highbury, he suddenly appears out of nowhere in his oldtimer, dispenses some random life advice, and rides off into the night.

Career statistics

External links

На терену се показује личност, Politika, 16 March 2008
Dule Savić za MONDO: Englezi uče o meni!, MTS Mondo, 20 May 2008
Profile at reprezentacija.rs

Living people
1955 births
People from Ub, Serbia
Serbian footballers
Serbian expatriate footballers
Yugoslav footballers
Yugoslavia international footballers
Yugoslav First League players
Red Star Belgrade footballers
Red Star Belgrade non-playing staff
La Liga players
Sporting de Gijón players
Lille OSC players
AS Cannes players
Ligue 1 players
Expatriate footballers in Spain
Expatriate footballers in France
Association football forwards